Philydrum is a genus of tufted, herbaceous, aquatic macrophyte plants, one of three genera constituting the plant family Philydraceae.

Philydrum lanuginosum is the sole known species. They are commonly known as frogsmouths and woolly waterlilies.

Woolly waterlilies occur naturally across south and east Asia, including India, S. China, Taiwan, Japan, Malaysia, Burma, Thailand, Vietnam; across Malesia including New Guinea; across northern and eastern Australia and the Pacific Islands.
In Australia they grow naturally in wetlands in northern WA, NT, Qld, NSW and Vic.

They have spongy, soft, hairy, herbaceous foliage. The spikes successively open many, attractive, fine yellow flowers. Long, pointed, green and woolly bracts up to  enclose each bud. As the spike grows, each successively mature bud's bract reflexes, opening the flower inside and subtending it, holding its delicate yellow 'petals' on display. They look like open yellow mouths hence the common name frogsmouths. Within, the two inner, smaller, yellow 'petals' stand around the reproductive parts, of the single stamen and style.

Woolly waterlilies have some popularity in Australian wetland landscaping and gardening, but have yet to become very well known.

 formerly included in genus
now in Helmholtzia 
 P. glaberrimum - Helmholtzia glaberrima 
 P. helmholtzii - Helmholtzia acorifolia

References

Monotypic Commelinales genera
Philydraceae
Taxa named by Joseph Banks
Taxa named by Daniel Solander
Taxa named by Joseph Gaertner